Sean McGoldrick (born 3 December 1991) is a Welsh professional boxer who has held the British and Commonwealth bantamweight titles since February 2023. As an amateur he was awarded the gold medal for the Bantamweight division at the 2010 Commonwealth Games

Amateur career
McGoldrick was born in Duffryn, Newport.  At the time of the games, he was an 18-year-old pupil at Duffryn Comprehensive School and the Wales national coach was Colin Jones.

On 24 October 2010 National Olympic Committee of Sri Lanka announced that Wanniarachchi had failed a drugs test taken during the 2010 Commonwealth Games. A urine sample provided by the boxer had contained nandrolone, a banned performance-enhancing drug. Wanniarachchi claims he failed the drugs test due to the asthma medication he was taking. Wanniarachchi subsequently failed the second drugs test and intended to launch an appeal.

In December 2010 McGoldrick was selected as BBC Wales Junior Sportsman of the Year.

In June 2011 McGoldrick was retroactively awarded the 2010 Commonwealth Games Bantamweight gold medal.

Professional boxing record

References 

Living people
Sportspeople from Newport, Wales
Boxers at the 2010 Commonwealth Games
Boxers at the 2014 Commonwealth Games
Welsh male boxers
Commonwealth Games bronze medallists for Wales
Commonwealth Games gold medallists for Wales
1991 births
Commonwealth Games medallists in boxing
Bantamweight boxers
Medallists at the 2010 Commonwealth Games
Medallists at the 2014 Commonwealth Games